The Spirit of Olympia is an album by David Arkenstone and Kostia, with David Lanz, released in 1992. It is a celebration of the Olympic games and incorporates several musical styles from around the world.

Track listing
"Prelude: Let the Games Begin!" – 4:03
"Savannah Runner" – 3:33
"Memories of Gold" – 3:14
"Keeper of the Flame" – 3:23
"From the Forge to the Field" – 3:35
"Heartfire" – 3:19
"Celebration" – 5:00
"Close Without Touching" – 5:24
"Glory" – 2:19
"A Night in the Village" – 14:44
"Zeus Sings" – 1:43
"Eastern Moon" – 2:44
"Catalonia" – 2:09
"Volga's Journey" – 1:50
"In the Shadow of Kilimanjaro" – 1:52
"On the Shores of Parana" – 2:37
"Festival of Olympia" – 1:49
"Walk with the Stars" – 4:45
"Marathon Man" – 5:29
"The Spirit of Olympia" – 3:41
 Tracks 1, 2, 7, 10, 12, and 13 composed by David Arkenstone and Kostia. Tracks 3, 5, 6, and 9 composed by David Arkenstone. Tracks 8 and 11 composed by Kostia. Tracks 4 composed by David Lanz.

Personnel
 David Arkenstone – keyboards, acoustic and electric guitars, flute, pan flute, fretless bass, pennywhistle, accordion, mandolin, percussion, voices
 Kostia – piano, keyboards, voices, orchestrations
 David Lanz – keyboards on "Keeper of the Flame"
 Danny Chase – drums, percussion
 Tena Hess – flutes
 Daryl Stuermer – electric guitars on tracks 2, 5, and 11
 Warren Wiegratz – saxophone solo on "From the Forge to the Field"
 Jerome Franke – violin solo on "Close Without Touching", string section leader
 Eric Segnitz, Mike Giacobassi, Tim Klabunde, Lucia Lin – violins
 Helen Reich – viola
 Paul Gmeinder – cello
 Linda Edelstein – oboe
 John Seydewitz – congas, additional percussion
 Sandy Schubert – clarinet
 Barry Benjamin, Neil Kimel, James Treviranus – French horns
 David Lussier, Amy Peterson, Jonathon Winkle – trombones
 James Brus, Thomas Schlueter – trumpets
 Paul Speer – electric guitar on "Keeper of the Flame"
 Neal Speer – drums on "Keeper of the Flame"
 James Reynolds – sequencing on "Keeper of the Flame"
 Steven Ray Allen – bass on "Keeper of the Flame"

References

1992 albums
David Arkenstone albums
Narada Productions albums